The River Dee is a river in eastern Ireland, flowing from County Cavan to flow into the River Glyde near the coast, in County Louth.

Legend
In the Táin Bó Cúailnge, Cúchulainn fights Lethan at Ath Carpat ("chariot ford") on the river Níth. The river takes its name from the Irish níth, meaning "combat". The modern name Dee derives from the town of Ardee (Baile Átha Fhirdhia, "town of Ferdiad's ford").

Course
The River Dee rises from a spring near Bailieboro in County Cavan and flows in an easterly direction for  through County Meath and County Louth before joining with the River Glyde at the village of Annagassan. The Dee in turn has three main tributaries: the Killary River which joins south of Drumconrath (Drumcondra), County Meath, the Gara River which joins west of Ardee, County Louth, and the White River which flows north from Dunleer, County Louth. There is one lake on the Dee, Whitewood Lake, near Nobber, County Meath.

Wildlife
The River Dee is a brown trout fishery.

See also

Rivers of Ireland

References

Rivers of County Louth
Rivers of County Meath